UFC Fight Night: Cowboy vs. Gaethje (also known as UFC Fight Night 158 or UFC on ESPN+ 16) was a mixed martial arts event produced by the Ultimate Fighting Championship that took place on September 14, 2019 at Rogers Arena in Vancouver, British Columbia, Canada.

Background
A lightweight bout between former UFC Lightweight Championship challenger Donald Cerrone and former WSOF Lightweight Champion Justin Gaethje served as the event's headliner.

A middleweight bout between former WSOF Middleweight and Light Heavyweight Champion David Branch and The Ultimate Fighter: Team Joanna vs. Team Cláudia light heavyweight winner Andrew Sanchez was scheduled for the event. However, it was reported that Branch was forced to pull out of the event due to injury and was replaced by Marvin Vettori. In turn, it was reported that Sanchez was forced to pull out of the event due to an eye infection, resulting in cancellation of the bout. In turn, the pairing was left intact and was rescheduled a month later at UFC Fight Night: Joanna vs. Waterson.

A welterweight bout between Michel Pereira and Sergey Khandozhko was scheduled for the event. However, it was reported that Khandozhko was removed from the card due to visa issues. He was replaced by promotional newcomer Tristan Connelly. At the weigh-ins, Pereira weighed in at 172 pounds, 1 pound over the welterweight non-title fight limit of 171. He was fined 20% of his purse and his bout with Connelly proceeded at a catchweight.

Results

Bonus awards
The following fighters received $50,000 bonuses.
Fight of the Night: Tristan Connelly vs. Michel Pereira (Michel Pereira was ineligible to receive any bonus money due to missing weight, therefore Tristan Connelly received a $100,000 bonus.)
Performance of the Night: Justin Gaethje and Misha Cirkunov

See also

 List of UFC events
 2019 in UFC
 List of current UFC fighters

References 

UFC Fight Night
Mixed martial arts in Canada
Sports competitions in Vancouver
2019 in mixed martial arts
2019 in British Columbia
2019 in Canadian sports